The Pascack Valley Regional High School District is a regional public high school district encompassing students from four communities in the Pascack Valley region of Bergen County, New Jersey, United States, serving students in ninth through twelfth grades from Hillsdale, Montvale, River Vale and Woodcliff Lake.

As of the 2019–20 school year, the district, comprising three schools, had an enrollment of 1,987 students and 168.07 classroom teachers (on an FTE basis), for a student–teacher ratio of 11.8:1.

The district is classified by the New Jersey Department of Education as being in District Factor Group "I", the second-highest of eight groupings. District Factor Groups organize districts statewide to allow comparison by common socioeconomic characteristics of the local districts. From lowest socioeconomic status to highest, the categories are A, B, CD, DE, FG, GH, I and J.

History
In 1955, Pascack Valley Regional High School District opened Pascack Valley High School with an enrollment of 650 students from the boroughs of Hillsdale, Montvale, River Vale, and Woodcliff Lake, having bonded $1,250,000 towards the costs of construction. Previously, students from those municipalities attended other local high schools, including Westwood High School. Students from Hillsdale, Montvale and Woodcliff Lake had attended Park Ridge High School. With increasing enrollment as the suburbs boomed, the towns, with state approval, formed a regional high school district.

During the next several years enrollment increased and so did the faculty and building capacity. Additional classrooms were added and the program of studies was expanded. Increased enrollment in 1963 resulted in double sessions. In September 1964, Pascack Hills High School opened up to students living in Montvale, Woodcliff Lake and a portion of Hillsdale, with a flexible scheduling program that allowed students to select courses using a system run by an analyst from International Telephone and Telegraph using a mainframe computer system. Pascack Valley High School had the balance of Hillsdale students and all of River Vale students. In the early 1990s, western portions of Hillsdale (west of Pascack Road) transitioned from sending to Pascack Hills to Pascack Valley.

By 1970, the enrollment was again up to capacity and building construction was necessary to house 1,800 students. This expansion of Pascack Valley High School provided additional classrooms, expanded department areas, and other facilities such as gymnasium, a new cafeteria and library.

In March 2008, the district announced plans to offer online courses, beginning in the 2008–09 school year, with that school year's seniors being given priority.

In July 2020 the district board of education voted to eliminate both the PVHS "Indians" and the "Cowboys" at Pascack Hills High School. In March 2021, the Board of Education ratified new team names that had been selected by a vote of students and staff at each school, with Pascack Hills being renamed the Broncos and Pascack Valley adopting the Panthers as its new team name.

Awards and recognition
In the 2000–01 school year, Pascack Valley Regional High School was recognized with the Best Practices Award by the New Jersey Department of Education for its "Senior Projects/Senior Alternate Assessment Program".
Pascack Hills High School was the 7th-ranked public high school in New Jersey out of 339 schools statewide in New Jersey Monthly magazine's September 2014 cover story on the state's "Top Public High Schools", using a new ranking methodology, after having been ranked 18th in the state out of 328 schools in 2012; Pascack Valley High School was ranked 39th in 2014 and 73rd in 2012. 
The Pascack Pi-oneers, a district-wide high school robotics team, has won several regional awards.

Schools
Schools in the district (with 2020–21 enrollment data from the National Center for Education Statistics) are:
 Pascack Hills High School opened in Montvale in 1964 and served 823 students in grades 9-12 from Montvale and Woodcliff Lake.
Timothy Wieland, Principal
Charleen Schwartzman, Assistant Principal
 Pascack Valley High School in Hillsdale opened in 1955 and served 1,141 students  in grades 9-12 from Hillsdale and River Vale.
John Puccio, Principal 
Thomas Gallione, Assistant Principal 
Christine Pollinger, Assistant Principal 
Park Academy is a therapeutic middle school program with 23 students in grades 4-8

Administration
Core members of the district's administration are:
Dr. Daniel Fishbein, Ed.D., Interim Superintendent of Schools
Yas Usami, Business Administrator / Board Secretary

Board of education
The district's board of education, with nine members, sets policy and oversees the fiscal and educational operation of the district through its administration. As a Type II school district, the board's trustees are elected directly by voters to serve three-year terms of office on a staggered basis, with three seats up for election each year held (since 2012) as part of the November general election. The board appoints a superintendent to oversee the day-to-day operation of the district. Seats on the board of education are allocated based on the population of the constituent districts, with three assigned to Hillsdale and two each assigned to Montvale, River Vale and Woodcliff Lake.

References

External links
Pascack Valley Regional High School District

Pascack Valley Regional High School District, National Center for Education Statistics
Hillsdale Public Schools
Montvale Public Schools
River Vale Public Schools
Woodcliff Lake Public Schools

Hillsdale, New Jersey
Montvale, New Jersey
River Vale, New Jersey
Woodcliff Lake, New Jersey
New Jersey District Factor Group I
Pascack Valley
School districts in Bergen County, New Jersey
School districts established in 1955